Nneka Colleen Egbujiobi is a Nigerian-American lawyer, best known as the founder and CEO of Hello Africa.

Education Career Salary and Net Worth 
Egbujiobi graduated from University of Michigan with a degree in English language and literature, before preceding to University of Wisconsin Law School where she received her Juris Doctor degree in 2012 and became an attorney, practicing in Pasadena, California. During her time in University of Michigan, she was a university correspondent for CNN. She created the online dating platform Hello Africa after briefly practicing law. Egbujiobi has worked as a correspondent for Beloit Daily News. She was Judy Robson extern when she was the majority leader of the Wisconsin State Senate. Her application, Hello Africa won Best Indigenous Mobile Application of the Year at the Africa Royalty Awards. Egbujiobi has approximately $2 - $10 million dollars

Personal life
Egbujiobi was born in Boston, Massachusetts and grew up in Wisconsin. She is from Okija, Ihiala, Anambra State, Nigeria. Her father is Leo Egbujiobi, an interventional cardiologist and philanthropist. Her mother is Bridget Egbujiobi. In 1979, her parents immigrated from Nigeria to the United States.

References

Living people
Year of birth missing (living people)
People from Boston
People from Anambra State
University of Wisconsin Law School alumni
University of Michigan alumni
Massachusetts lawyers
Lawyers from Boston
20th-century American lawyers
21st-century American lawyers
20th-century American women lawyers
21st-century American women lawyers
African-American lawyers
African-American women lawyers
American people of Igbo descent
American technology chief executives
American women chief executives
Technology company founders
American technology company founders
American women company founders
20th-century African-American women
20th-century African-American people
21st-century African-American women
21st-century African-American people